The Two Sides of Jack Wilson is an album by American jazz pianist Jack Wilson recorded for the Atlantic label and released in 1964. The album title refers to the uptempo tracks featured on side one of the original LP and the ballads on side two.

Reception

AllMusic awarded the album 3 stars, stating: "Wilson has a good piano trio date here in the classic style: focus on the piano, with stellar support from an immensely capable rhythm team."

Track listing
All compositions by Jack Wilson except as indicated
 "The Scene Is Clean" (Tadd Dameron) - 5:29
 "Glass Enclosure" (Bud Powell) - 3:42
 "Good Time Joe" - 5:07
 "Kinta" - 3:59
 "Once Upon a Summertime" (Eddie Barclay, Michel Legrand, Eddy Marnay, Johnny Mercer) - 3:33
 "Sometime Ago" (Sergio Mihanovich) - 3:00
 "The Good Life" (Sacha Distel, Jack Reardon) - 4:42
 "The End of a Love Affair" (Edward Redding) - 7:08

Personnel 
Jack Wilson - piano
Leroy Vinnegar - bass
Philly Joe Jones - drums

References 

1964 albums
Jack Wilson (jazz pianist) albums
Atlantic Records albums